Cyclopentyl methyl ether (CPME), also known as methoxycyclopentane, is hydrophobic ether solvent.

Synthesis 
The synthesis of this compound can be done in two different ways:

(1) by methylation of the cyclopentanol.

 

(2) by the addition of methanol to the cyclopentene. This second method is better from the point of view of sustainable chemistry since it does not produce by-products.

Applications 
Cyclopentyl methyl ether is used in organic synthesis, mainly as a solvent. However it is also useful in extraction, polymerization, crystallization and surface coating.

Some examples of reactions where it acts as a solvent are:

Reactions involving alkali agents: nucleophilic substitutions of heteroatoms (alcohols and amines) 
Lewis acids-mediated reactions: Beckmann Reaction, Friedel-Crafts Reaction etc.
Reactions using Organometallic reagents or basic agents: Claisen condensation, formation of enolates or Grignard reaction.
Reduction and oxidation.
Reactions with transition metal catalysts.
Reactions with azeotropical removal of water: acetalization, etc.

References

Ethers
Ether solvents
Cyclopentyl compounds